Song Hongjuan (born July 4, 1984 in Jilin) is a Chinese race walker.

Achievements

References

1984 births
Living people
Athletes (track and field) at the 2004 Summer Olympics
Chinese female racewalkers
Olympic athletes of China
Athletes from Jilin